Elk Mountain may refer to:

Settlements
Elk Mountain, Utah, a settlement in the U.S. state of Utah
Elk Mountain, Wyoming, a settlement in the U.S. state of Wyoming

Summits
Elk Mountain (British Columbia), a mountain in British Columbia, Canada
Elk Mountain (California), a mountain in Lake County, California, USA
Elk Mountain (Grand County, Colorado), a mountain in the U.S. state of Colorado
Elk Mountain (Routt County, Colorado), a mountain in the U.S. state of Colorado
Elk Mountain (Maryland), a mountain ridge in the U.S. state of Maryland
Elk Mountain (Carbon County, Montana), a mountain in Carbon County, Montana
Elk Mountain (Flathead County, Montana), a mountain in Flathead County, Montana
Elk Mountain (Lincoln County, Montana), a mountain in Lincoln County, Montana
Elk Mountain (Madison County, Montana), a mountain in Madison County, Montana
Elk Mountain (Missoula County, Montana), a mountain in Missoula County, Montana
Elk Mountain (Park County, Montana), a mountain in Park County, Montana
Elk Mountain (Sanders County, Montana), a mountain in Sanders County, Montana
Elk Mountain (Sweet Grass County, Montana), a mountain in Sweet Grass County, Montana
Elk Mountain (Nevada)

Elk Mountain (Clallam County, Washington), in the Olympic Mountains
Elk Mountain (West Virginia), part of the Shavers Fork Mountain Complex, West Virginia
Elk Mountain (Teton County, Wyoming), a mountain in the Teton Range, Wyoming
Elk Mountain (Carbon County, Wyoming), a mountain in the Medicine Bow Mountains, Wyoming

Other
Elk Mountain Ski Area, a ski resort in Union Dale, Pennsylvania, USA

See also
 Elk Mountains (disambiguation)
 Elkhorn Mountains (disambiguation)